Kevin Thomas may refer to:

 Kevin Thomas (cornerback, born 1978), American football cornerback for the Buffalo Bills
 Kevin Thomas (cornerback, born 1986), American football cornerback for the Philadelphia Eagles
 Kevin Thomas (film critic) (born 1936), entertainment writer for the Los Angeles Times
 Kevin Thomas (footballer, born 1944) (1944–2022), English football (soccer) player
 Kevin Thomas (footballer, born 1975), Scottish football (soccer) player
 Kevin Thomas (cricketer) (born 1963), former English cricketer
 Kevin Thomas (darts player) (born 1980), Welsh darts player
 Kevin Thomas (politician), American politician

See also
 Kevin Thoms (born 1979), American television/film actor and voice actor